Events from the year 1995 in France.

Incumbents
 President: François Mitterrand (until 17 May), Jacques Chirac (starting 17 May)
 Prime Minister: Édouard Balladur (until 18 May), Alain Juppé (starting 18 May)

Events
 January – SIVU des Inforoutes de l'Ardèche is founded.
21 February – Ibrahim Ali, a 17-year-old Comorian living in France, is murdered by 3 far right National Front activists.
13 April – Presidential Election held.
7 May – Presidential Election held with Jacques Chirac elected as fifth president of the Fifth Republic.
11 June – Municipal Elections held.
13 June – President Jacques Chirac announces the resumption of nuclear tests in French Polynesia.
18 June – Municipal Elections held.
25 July – a gas bottle explodes in the Saint-Michel – Notre-Dame station, killing 8 and wounding 80 people. (see: 1995 Paris Metro bombing)
17 August – a bomb at the Arc de Triomphe wounds 17 people.
26 August – a huge bomb is found on the railroad tracks of a high-speed rail line near Lyon.
3 September – a bomb malfunctions in a square in Paris, wounding 4.
7 September – a car bomb at a Jewish school in Lyon wounds 14.
18 September – Renault launches the Renault Mégane, a range of hatchbacks, saloons, estates, coupes and cabriolets to replace the R19.
24 September – Student, Eric Borel, killed 14 people (including his parents) and injured five others, in a rampage in Toulon, before committing suicide.
27 – 28 September – Bob Denard's mercenaries capture President Said Mohammed Djohor of the Comoros; the local army does not resist.
29 September – Khaled Kelkal, a leader of the Armed Group (GIA) which carried out the attacks, is killed by EPIGN gendarmerie members resisting arrest.
October – Peugeot launches the 406 range of saloons, estates and coupés that replaces the 405. It also enters the people carrier market with the 806, which will also be sold as the Citroen Synergie, Fiat Ulysse and Lancia Z as part of a venture between PSA Peugeot Citroen and Fiat. 
4 October – France launches a counter-coup in the Comoros with 600 soldiers. They arrest Bob Denard and his mercenaries and take Denard to France; Caabi el-Yachroutu becomes the interim president.
6 October – a gas bottle explodes in station Maison Blanche of the Paris Métro, wounding 13.
17 October – a gas bottle explodes between the Musée d'Orsay and Saint-Michel – Notre-Dame stations, wounding 29.
17 October- French-woman Jeanne Calment reaches the confirmed age of 120 years and 238 days making her the oldest person ever recorded.
15-16 December – Two members of the Order of the Solar Temple kill 14 other people including three children then commit suicide at Vercors Massif.  These bodies are discovered on 23 December, the day after the first publication of the report of the Parliamentary Commission on Cults in France.

Arts and literature
La Haine is released.

Sport
9 April – Paris–Roubaix cycle race won by Franco Ballerini of Italy.
1 July – Tour de France begins.
2 July – French Grand Prix won by Michael Schumacher of Germany.
23 July – Tour de France ends, won by Miguel Indurain of Spain.

Births

January to March
13 January – Léna Marrocco, figure skater
28 January 
Wylan Cyprien, footballer
Calvin Hemery, tennis player
5 February – Rouguy Diallo, triple jumper
6 February – Enzo Crivelli, footballer
9 February – Yann Bodiger, footballer
13 February – Georges-Kévin Nkoudou, footballer
16 February – Nicolas Gavory, footballer 
17 February – Stéphane Sparagna, footballer
27 February – Charlotte Bonnet, swimmer
2 March – Ange-Freddy Plumain, footballer
9 March – Baptiste Santamaria, footballer 
24 March – Enzo Fernández, footballer

April to October
1 April – Maxence Perrin, actor
8 April – Farès Bahlouli, footballer
23 April – Lénaëlle Gilleron-Gorry, figure skater
24 April – Axel Chapelle, pole vaulter
10 May – Gabriella Papadakis, ice dancer
23 May – Younès Kaabouni, footballer
31 May – Romain Le Gac, ice dancer
6 June – Mira Boumejmajen, artistic gymnast
17 June – Clément Lenglet, footballer
22 June – Wilhem Belocian, sprinter
24 June – Hervin Ongenda, footballer
25 June – Jean-Philippe Gbamin, footballer 
15 July – Corentin Jean, footballer
26 July – Marco Ilaimaharitra, footballer
13 August – Presnel Kimpembe, footballer
22 August – Aristote Madiani, footballer
27 August – Joelly Belleka, basketball player

November to December
3 November – Coline Mattel, ski jumper
12 November – Thomas Lemar, footballer 
21 November – Simon Hocquaux, figure skater
28 November – Thomas Didillon, footballer
1 December – Sophia Serseri, gymnast
5 December – Anthony Martial, footballer

Deaths

January to March
21 January – Philippe Casado, cyclist (b. 1964)
26 January – Marcel Bidot, cyclist (b. 1902)
27 January – Jean Tardieu, artist, musician, poet and author (b. 1903)
1 February – François Boutin, Thoroughbred horse trainer (b. 1937)
2 February – André Frossard, journalist and essayist (b. 1915)
13 March – Odette Sansom, World War II heroine (b. 1912)

April to June
5 April – Christian Pineau, French Resistance leader and politician (b. 1904)
18 May – Henri Laborit, physician, writer and philosopher (b. 1914)
25 May – Élie Bayol, motor racing driver (b. 1914)
2 June – Alexandre de Marenches, military officer (b. 1921)
3 June – Jean-Patrick Manchette, novelist (b. 1942)
22 June – Yves Congar, priest and theologian (b. 1904)
23 June – Henri de Laulanie, Jesuit priest and agriculturalist (b. 1920)
27 June – Jacques Berque, Islamic scholar and sociologist (b. 1910)

July to September
8 July – Paul Bonneau, composer (b. 1918)
12 July – Jules Henri Saiset, existentialist philosopher, dramatist, novelist, and critic (b. 1925)
15 July – Robert-Joseph Coffy, Roman Catholic cardinal (b. 1920)
19 July – René Privat, cyclist (b. 1930)
23 July – Fabien Galateau, cyclist (b. 1913)
29 July – Philippe De Lacy, actor (b. 1917)
6 August – André Fleury, composer, pianist and organist (b. 1903)
11 August – Marcel Moussy, screenwriter and television director (b. 1924)
19 August – Pierre Schaeffer, composer, inventor of musique concrète (b. 1910)
22 August – Gilles Andruet, chess player (b. 1958)
29 August – Pierre Max Dubois, composer (b. 1930)
September – René Zazzo, psychologist (b. 1910)
4 September – Edmond Jouhaud, one of four generals who staged the Algiers putsch of 1961 (b. 1905)
24 September – Eric Borel, spree killer (b. 1978)

October to December
7 October – Gérard de Vaucouleurs, astronomer (b. 1918)
19 October – André Lalande, military officer (b. 1913)
4 November – Gilles Deleuze, philosopher (b. 1925)
23 November – Louis Malle, film director (b. 1932)

Full date unknown
Adrien Goybet, Chevalier of the French Legion of Honor (b. 1922)
Jean-Yves Couliou, painter (b. 1916)
Gilbert Martineau, author and curator of the French properties on St Helena (b. 1918)

See also
 1995 in French television
 List of French films of 1995

References

1990s in France